Fissurella gemmata is a species of sea snail, a marine gastropod mollusk in the family Fissurellidae, the keyhole limpets and slit limpets.

References

 Keen, A. M. 1971. Sea Shells of Tropical West America. Marine mollusks from Baja California to Peru, ed. 2. Stanford University Press. xv, 1064 pp., 22 pls.

External links
 To Biodiversity Heritage Library (8 publications)
 To World Register of Marine Species

Fissurellidae
Gastropods described in 1847